Aspasmodes briggsi is a species of clingfish native to the Seychelles.  This species grows to a length of  SL.  This species is the only known member of its genus. This species was described by J.L.B. Smith in 1957 from a type collected at La Digue, Seychelles. The specific name honours the author of a 1955 monograph on the clingfishes, the American ichthyologist John "Jack" C. Briggs (1920-2018) of the University of Florida.

References

Gobiesocidae
Monotypic fish genera